Dwight (Fox Point) Water Aerodrome  is located adjacent to Dwight, Ontario, Canada.

See also
 Dwight Aerodrome
 Dwight/South Portage Water Aerodrome

References

Registered aerodromes in Ontario
Seaplane bases in Ontario